Acanthostigmella is a genus in the Tubeufiaceae family of fungi.

References

External links
Acanthostigmella at Index Fungorum

Tubeufiaceae
Taxa named by Franz Xaver Rudolf von Höhnel